The James L. Lawther House is an octagon house in Red Wing, Minnesota, United States.  The owner, James Lawther, built it after he visited Dubuque, Iowa and toured the Langworthy House there.  At the time, the Langworthy House was the grandest house of its type on the upper Mississippi River.  The Lawther House was built in 1857, with an addition in 1870.  Its location, at the corner of Third and Hill Streets, has been termed "one of the most architecturally significant intersections in Minnesota" and is part of the Red Wing Residential Historic District.  It is listed on the National Register of Historic Places.

James Lawther was a successful businessman and merchant in Red Wing.  Besides the house, he built the Gladstone Building in downtown.  He also contributed to civic causes such as the Carnegie-Lawther Library, the YMCA, and the park on Barn Bluff.  The Gladstone Building is listed on the National Register, and the library is a contributing property to the Red Wing Mall Historic District.

Now serving as a bed and breakfast, the all-brick home features an ornate cupola and central chimney.

References

1857 establishments in Minnesota Territory
Houses completed in 1857
Houses in Goodhue County, Minnesota
Houses on the National Register of Historic Places in Minnesota
Individually listed contributing properties to historic districts on the National Register in Minnesota
National Register of Historic Places in Goodhue County, Minnesota
Octagon houses in the United States
Red Wing, Minnesota